The  is a Go competition.

Biography
The Ryusei is a Go competition used by the Japanese Nihon-Kiin. It was started in 1991 and is a fast go tournament. The tournament consists of four sections. The winner from each section, along with the player who won the most games in each section play in a single knockout tournament. The winner is decided this way. The winner's purse is 5,000,000 Yen ($43,000).

Past winners

References

External links
 Ryusei finals
 Official website (in Japanese)
 Nihon Ki-in archive (in Japanese)

Go competitions in Japan